Neoplectops is a genus of parasitic flies in the family Tachinidae. There are at least two described species in Neoplectops.

Species
These two species belong to the genus Neoplectops:
 Neoplectops nudibasis Malloch, 1930
 Neoplectops pomonellae (Schnabl & Mokrecki, 1903)

References

Further reading

 
 
 
 

Tachinidae
Articles created by Qbugbot